Teeswater (Thompson Field) Airport  is located  south of Teeswater, Ontario, Canada.

References

Registered aerodromes in Ontario